France is a country in western Europe.

France may also refer to:

Film and television 
 France Télévisions, a national public television broadcaster
 France 2, a television channel
France 3, a television channel
 France 4, a television channel
 France 5, a television channel
 France Ô, a television channel featuring programming from France's overseas departments and territories
 France Info (TV channel), a national news channel
 France 24, an international multilingual news channel
 France (film), 2021 comedy-drama film

Radio 
 Radio France, a national public radio broadcaster
 Radio France Internationale, an international public radio broadcaster

Transportation 
 SS France (1910), an ocean liner
 SS France (1960), an ocean liner, later renamed the SS Norway
 France II, a sailing ship
 French battleship France, a Courbet class battleship
 Argentine (Paris Métro), temporarily renamed France on 18 December 2022, ahead of 2022 World Cup final, which was played by France and Argentina.

Other uses
 France (name)
 France River, a tributary of Chibougamau Lake in Quebec, Canada
 France national football team
 France (album)

See also 

 
 French (disambiguation)
 Lafrance (disambiguation)
 Little France (disambiguation)
 Nouvelle France (disambiguation)
 New France (disambiguation)
 Petite France (disambiguation)
 Petty France (disambiguation)
 
 
 Anatole France (Paris Métro)